Nawab Jehandad Khan Tanoli  was a chief of Tanoli tribe in the Hazara region of the North-West Frontier of British India and Nawab of Amb.
Jehandad Khan Tanoli was the son of Mir Painda Khan, a fighter against the Sikh Empire. He became the ruler of Amb on the death of his father in 1844.

Life
Jehandad Khan was the son of Mir Painda Khan. Jehandad Khan became the ruler of Amb on the death of his father in 1844.

It was said, "Of all the tribal chiefs of Hazara, the most powerful [was] said to be Jehandad Khan of the Tanoli." 
His territories lay on both banks of the Indus, and Jehandad Khan was highly respected among his peoples as the son of Painda Khan.
In the words of Major J. Abbott 

As far as Jehandad Khan's domain of Upper Tanawal is concerned, with its capital at Amb, the term jagir has never been applicable to it. The British Government considered "Upper Tannowul" as a chiefship held under the British Government, but as a rule they did not possess internal jurisdiction within it. The Chief managed his own people in his own way, without regard to the laws, rules or systems of British India. This tenure resembled that of the Chiefs of Patiala, Jhind, Nabha, Kapurthala, and others.

In 1852, Jehandad Khan was ordered by the President of the Board of Administration, who was visiting Hazara to see him at Haripur about the murder of two British officers, Carne and Tapp of the Salt Department, who had been killed in the country of Jehandad Khan in 1851. When the President ordered the Khan to give up the murderers or else suffer the consequences, the Khan is reported to have replied "We should consider your presence in our kingdom an honour, but our country is a rather difficult one for your army." 

However, for all his public bravado, the Khan recognised his limitations and in private protested his innocence to the British administrators, and was eventually cleared of the charges. In due course, Mir Jehandad Khan was granted the personal and temporary title of 'Nawab', which in succeeding generations was to be granted to the family in perpetuity.

When he died, the Khan left a nine-year-old son, Muhammad Akram Khan, who succeeded him.

References

Hindkowan people
History of Khyber Pakhtunkhwa
Nawabs of Amb
Princely rulers of Pakistan
Nawabs of Pakistan
1868 deaths
1820 births